John Sharper (born April 23, 1984) is an American professional basketball player who last played for Karpoš Sokoli of the Macedonian First League.

Professional career
Not being drafted by any NBA team and being unknown in Europe, Sharper signed for the 2006-07 season with the ABA club San Diego Wildcats. During his career, Sharper played in Ukraine, Cyprus, Switzerland, Israel and Macedonia.

External links
Profile at eurobasket.com
Profile at goaztecs.com
Profile at espn.go.com

1984 births
Living people
American expatriate basketball people in Cyprus
American expatriate basketball people in Israel
American expatriate basketball people in Ukraine
American expatriate basketball people in North Macedonia
American expatriate basketball people in Switzerland
Basketball players from Oakland, California
BBC Monthey players
BC Budivelnyk players
KK Rabotnički players
San Diego State Aztecs men's basketball players
Shooting guards
American men's basketball players